Woranuch Bhirombhakdi, née Wongsawan, or usually known by her nickname Nune is a Thai actress in Thai soap operas (lakorn) and films. Her first lakorn role was Pob Pee Fa.

Early life
Woranuch was born on September 24, 1980, is the third child of 5 siblings. She graduated with a Bachelor of Arts degree from Suan Dusit University.

Career
She made her feature film debut in the 2005 Thai Choem, or Midnight My Love, directed by Kongdej Jaturanrasamee. She portrayed Nual, a masseuse working in a Bangkok massage parlour, who forms a relationship with downtrodden cab driver, Bati, played by Petchtai Wongkamlao. Nune has received many awards for her roles in lakorns, including the "Top Awards 2004, Best Leading Actress award" for the lakorn Mae Ai Sa-uen. Nune also co-hosts the show Thi Ni Mo Chit.

After her contract with Channel 7 ended in 2012, she became a freelance actress.

Personal life
In May 2010, she married her longtime boyfriend 'Todd' Piti Bhirombhakdi, son of Santi Bhirombhakdi, a Thai business executive. The traditional wedding ceremony and the registration of her marriage was held on May 14, 2010, but the reception was held on May 19, 2010.

In addition to her work in the entertainment industry, Woranuch also has many private businesses, including a dance school, a restaurant, a food supplement, and a condominium business.

Filmography

Film

Television

References

External links

Woranuch Bhirombhakdi
Living people
1980 births
Woranuch Bhirombhakdi
Woranuch Bhirombhakdi
Woranuch Bhirombhakdi
Woranuch Bhirombhakdi
Woranuch Bhirombhakdi
Woranuch Bhirombhakdi